Línxià, the toponym for a number a places in Gansu, China formerly known as Hezhou, refers to:

Linxia Hui Autonomous Prefecture
Linxia City, county-level city in Linxia Prefecture
Linxia County, county in Linxia Prefecture

See also 
 Lingxia (disambiguation)